A Dog Barking at the Moon is a Chinese drama film, directed by Xiang Zi and released in 2019. A family drama, the film centres on the fallout of Juimei's (Naren Hua) discovery that her husband Huang Tao (Wu Renyuan) is secretly gay.

The cast also includes Nan Ji as their daughter Xiaoyu, and Thomas Fiquet as Xiaoyu's foreign-born husband Benjamin.

The film premiered in the Panorama program at the 2019 Berlin International Film Festival, where it won the Jury Prize from the Teddy Awards program for LGBTQ-themed films at the festival. At the 2019 Inside Out Film and Video Festival, it won the award for Best First Feature Film.

References

External links
 

2019 drama films
2019 films
2019 LGBT-related films
Chinese drama films
Chinese LGBT-related films
Gay-related films